The Colombian Association of Actuaries is the professional association of actuaries in Colombia. The Association was formed on 17 June 1970. It is a full member of the International Actuarial Association. The current president of the Association is Andrés Vesga.

References

External links
 Colombian Association of Actuaries official website

Actuarial associations
Professional associations based in Colombia